XHQJ-FM is a radio station on 105.9 FM in Guadalajara, broadcasting from Cerro del Cuatro. The station is owned by Radiorama and carries its Éxtasis Digital adult contemporary format.

History
XHQJ received its first concession on February 23, 1987. It was owned by Radiorama subsidiary Sociedad de Radiodifusión y Televisión, S.A.

References

Radio stations in Guadalajara
Radio stations established in 1987